Robert Joseph Silveria Jr. (born March 3, 1959), also known as The Boxcar Killer, is an American serial killer currently serving double life sentences in Wyoming. Silveria was also convicted in Kansas for the killing of Charles Randall Boyd, and in Florida for the killing of Willie Clark.

For 15 years, Silveria rode the rails, killing fellow freight-train riders throughout the United States. A police detective and prosecutor in Salem, Oregon unravelled the truth of Silveria's killing spree, which began with a murder in Salem. By the end of their investigation, Silveria had confessed to murdering 28 people.

Silveria is currently imprisoned in Wyoming Medium Correctional Institution in Torrington, Wyoming, where he serves as the head cook and support system for numerous inmates.

See also
 Freight Train Riders of America

General:
 List of serial killers in the United States
 List of serial killers by number of victims

References

External links

Court TV Series Mugshots: Robert Silveria 3rd Rail Man episode

1959 births
American people convicted of murder
American prisoners sentenced to life imprisonment
American serial killers
Hoboes
Living people
Male serial killers
People convicted of murder by Wyoming
People from Redwood City, California
Prisoners sentenced to life imprisonment by Wyoming